Avilés is one of 8 comarcas, administrative divisions of Asturias, which is a province and an autonomous community in Spain .

The comarca of Avilés is divided into ten municipalities:
Avilés
Candamo
Castrillón
Corvera de Asturias
Cudillero
Gozón
Illas
Muros de Nalón
Pravia
Soto del Barco

Comarcas of Asturias